John Edwin Pomfret (September 21, 1898 – November 26, 1981) was an American academic and administrator who served as the director of the Henry E. Huntington Library and Art Gallery and the twentieth president of the College of William & Mary.

Early history
John Edwin Pomfret was born in Philadelphia on September 21, 1898.  He received his Bachelor and master's degrees at the University of Pennsylvania. His specialty was the history of Colonial America, particularly the Province of New Jersey.

From 1925 to 1934. Pomfret was an associate professor of history at Princeton University. In 1936, he was appointed as an assistant dean at Princeton.

In 1937 Pomfret became the dean of Vanderbilt University's Senior College of Arts and Science and Graduate School

William and Mary
In 1941, Pomfret was appointed president of William and Mary. As president, he collaborated with Colonial Williamsburg in the founding of the Omohundro Institute of Early American History and Culture. In 1951, Pomfret resigned from William and Mary in the wake of a grade changing scandal involving the college's football team. The college's board of visitors censured Pomfret for the scandal, although he'd had no knowledge of it. Some board members wanted to force Pomfret out of office since he opposed expansion of the college football program.

Huntington Library
In 1951, Pomfret became the director of the Huntington Library. Due to the scandal at 
William and Mary, he had offered to withdraw his acceptance of the Huntington offer.  After an investigation cleared Pomfret, the Huntington Board told Pomfret that they still wanted him. He served as director until his retirement in 1966.

Pomfret died in Camden, South Carolina on November 26, 1981.

His papers from his time as president can be found at the Special Collections Research Center at the College of William and Mary. A full account of his career and an assessment of his personality by Allan Nevins will be found in Pomfret's festschrift, The Reinterpretation of Early American History, edited by Ray Allen Billington (The Huntington Library, San Marino, CA, 1966).

Memberships
Phi Beta Kappa (member of senate, 1943–55; vice-president, United Chapters, 1946–51)
Pi Kappa Alpha
American Antiquarian Society
Massachusetts Historical Society
Franklin Inn Club (Philadelphia)
Sunset Club (Los Angeles)
Twilight Club (Pasadena)

Writings

References

External links
Finding aid for Office of the President. John Edwin Pomfret
SCRC Wiki page for John Edwin Pomfret

1987 deaths
Presidents of the College of William & Mary
1898 births
University of Pennsylvania alumni
Princeton University faculty
Vanderbilt University faculty
Vanderbilt University administrators
Pi Kappa Alpha
Directors of museums in the United States
People associated with the Huntington Library
People from Philadelphia